Stambolić is a Serbian surname Стамболић. Notable people with the surname include:

Ivan Stambolić (1936–2000), Serbian politician
Petar Stambolić (1912–2007), Yugoslav politician
Vesna Stambolić (born 1961), Serbian politician

Serbian surnames